MLKS Victoria Sulejówek  is a Polish association football from Sulejówek, Masovian Voivodeship.

The men's football team currently (in 2020–21) plays in the IV liga Mazovia. The team last played in the III liga in 2017–18 and 2018–19. In 2018–19 Victoria Sulejówek also reached the round of 64 in the 2018–19 Polish Cup.

References

Official site

Football clubs in Poland
Football clubs in Masovian Voivodeship
Sport in Masovian Voivodeship
Mińsk County
1957 establishments in Poland
Association football clubs established in 1957